Same-sex marriage in Quebec has been legal since March 19, 2004 in accordance with a ruling from the Quebec Court of Appeal that the heterosexual definition of marriage violated the Canadian Charter of Rights and Freedoms. Quebec became the third Canadian province after Ontario and British Columbia and the fifth jurisdiction in the world to open marriage to same-sex couples.

Court ruling
In 2000, Michael Hendricks and René Leboeuf applied for a marriage licence, but were turned down by a clerk who read out the sections of provincial law that defined marriage as being between "a man and a woman". After the rejection, they filed suit against the Government of Quebec, alleging that its refusal to perform and recognise same-sex marriage violated the Canadian Charter of Rights and Freedoms (Charte canadienne des droits et libertés). Two conservative organisations, the Evangelical Fellowship of Canada and the Catholic Civil Rights League, were given intevenor status in the case, Hendricks and Leboeuf v. Quebec. The lawsuit was heard in the Quebec Superior Court on 8, 9, 12, 13, 14, 15 and 16 November 2001. The provincial and federal governments had initially opposed the court bid; provincial Attorney General Paul Bégin argued that "gays and lesbians were not suffering any form of discrimination in [Quebec]", while federal Attorney General Anne McLellan argued that the definition of marriage was at the Parliament of Canada's discretion and not a matter for the courts to decide. A lawyer representing the conservative religious groups argued that if the court ruled in favor of same-sex marriage "[h]is heterosexual clients would no longer be able to marry. That is because, to them, marriage is a heterosexual institution." Daniel Cere, a Catholic professor at McGill University, who filed an affidavit for the court, said that same-sex marriage "would fracture the basis of shared religious and civil peace in the province". Rabbi David Novak also filed an affidavit for the court, stating that same-sex marriage would "create a schism between Jews and the rest of society", and said that Judaism "expect[ed] them [gay people] to remain celibate for life". Other affidavits from religious groups included one from an anonymous Muslim imam, stating that same-sex marriage "would invalidate Muslim beliefs, preventing Muslims from full participation in Canadian society", while one from a conservative Protestant professor at Regent College said that same-sex marriage "would drive a stake into the heart of Protestant beliefs".

Attorney Noël Saint-Pierre argued that denying marriage to same-sex couples constituted discrimination as said couples were unable to access many legal and benefits often taken for granted by married opposite-sex couples, such as alimony, immigration rights, child support, hospital visitation rights, protection from domestic violence, etc. Saint-Pierre also refuted the religious groups' claims, citing the Netherlands, where same-sex marriage has been legal since 2001: "The fears of the religious conservatives did not materialize. Christians did not stop marrying. Jews did not flee the country." Judge Louise Lemelin ruled in the couple's favour on September 6, 2002. The court gave the federal government two years in which to modify federal law to allow gays and lesbians to marry. A lawyer representing the plaintiff couple told the Montreal Gazette:

The federal government filed an appeal of the decision of the Superior Court on September 9, 2002, but abandoned that appeal in 2003, the year same-sex marriage was legalized in Ontario and British Columbia. The case continued, with the group of religious conservatives opposing the plaintiffs' claims. The group argued that the legalisation of same-sex marriage was unconstitutional under the Constitution Act, 1867, would prevent heterosexual couples from marrying and "weaken the meaning of marriage". On March 19, 2004, the Quebec Court of Appeal ruled similarly to the Ontario and British Columbia courts, upholding Hendricks and Leboeuf in a unanimous 5–0 vote, and ordering that it take effect immediately. Hendricks and Leboeuf immediately sought a marriage licence; the usual 20-day waiting period was waived, and they were wed on April 1 at the Palais de justice in Montreal. Hendricks said, "The floodgates seem to be open and it looks like Canada is going to become the first North American country that has equal marriage... This is wonderful." Following the court decision, provincial Attorney General Marc Bellemare announced that the government would abide by the ruling. The Quebec decision meant that more than two-thirds of the Canadian population were living in provinces where same-sex marriage is legal. Subsequent cases, as well as federal legislation, have expanded this number to cover the entire country.

Provincial legislation

Civil unions

In 2002, the National Assembly of Quebec unanimously passed a bill legalising civil unions for both same-sex and opposite-sex partners, offering many of the same rights, benefits and responsibilities as marriage, including the right to adopt children jointly. Civil unions are performed by court clerks, notaries, mayors, members of municipal councils or borough councils, municipal officials or authorised religious officiants. Once the document is signed by both partners and the witnesses, the union is formally registered with the Director of Civil Status. Quebec civil unions are not recognised in other parts of Canada or other countries.

Marriage
In November 2004, the National Assembly enacted An Act to amend the Civil Code as regards marriage, amending the Civil Code of Quebec to replace references to "husband and wife" with "spouses" and permit civil unions to be converted to marriages. Quebec became the first province in Canada to bring its laws in line with the legalisation of same-sex marriage and add a gender-neutral definition of spouse in its marriage laws.

Marriage and civil union statistics
From 2004 to 2021, 9,662 same-sex marriages were performed in Quebec, representing about 2.5% of all marriages contracted during that time. There were also 1,250 same-sex civil unions (from 2002 to 2021), representing about 28% of all civil unions.

Between 2004 and 2008, 17% of same-sex marriages were between couples from other provinces or territories, or from the United States. The following table shows the number of marriages and civil unions performed in Quebec as per data published by the Institut de la statistique du Québec. Figures for 2020 and 2021 are lower than previous years because of the restrictions in place due to the COVID-19 pandemic.

Religious performance
In 2008, the synod of the Anglican Diocese of Montreal voted to allow its parishes to bless same-sex unions. The measure includes a freedom of conscience clause for clergy opposed to blessing same-sex unions. In July 2016, Bishop Mary Irwin-Gibson said she would allow her clergy to perform same-sex marriages.

Similarly, the Anglican Diocese of Quebec has allowed blessings of same-sex unions since 2012. Bishop Bruce Myers expressed disappointment in July 2019 when the Anglican Church of Canada narrowly rejected a motion to approve same-sex marriage. On 24 November 2019, the synod of the Diocese of Quebec voted 37–6 to request Bishop Myers to authorise the solemnisation of same-sex marriages. In response to the request, Myers said, "You'll here more from me, because… what this motion also expects is that I will come back to the diocese with some specifics around how such a request would be implemented, and being clear about things like safeguards for those who do not wish to exercise and offer this ministry."

The Anglican Diocese of Ottawa, which encompasses parts of western Quebec, including the Outaouais region, has allowed solemnisations of same-sex marriages since 2016. Same-sex marriages are not performed in the Anglican Diocese of Moosonee, which encompasses the northwestern Eeyou Istchee communities. The marriage canon of the Anglican Church of Canada serves as the canon on marriage in the diocese. Similarly, the Diocese of The Arctic, encompassing the northern Nunavik region, does not allow its parishes to perform same-sex marriages.

Public opinion
A 2017 CROP poll showed that Quebec had the highest popular support for same-sex marriage in Canada, at 80%. Nationwide, 74% of Canadians found it "great that in Canada, two people of the same sex can get married", while 26% disagreed.

See also
Same-sex marriage in Canada
LGBT rights in Canada

Notes

References

External links

Catholic Civil Rights League v. Hendricks, 2004 CanLII 20538 (QC CA)

LGBT in Quebec
Quebec
Politics of Quebec
Quebec law
2004 in LGBT history

es:Matrimonio entre personas del mismo sexo en Quebec